This is a list of members of the South Australian Legislative Council from 1861 to 1865.

This was the second Legislative Council to be elected under the Constitution of 1856, which provided for a house consisting of eighteen members to be elected from the whole State acting as one Electoral District; that six members, selected by lot, should be replaced at General Elections after four years, another six to be replaced four years later and thenceforth each member should have a term of twelve years.

References

Members of South Australian parliaments by term
19th-century Australian politicians